The Saint Anselm Hawks are the intercollegiate athletic teams that represent Saint Anselm College, located in Goffstown, New Hampshire, in NCAA Division II sporting competitions.

The Hawks are primarily members of the Northeast-10 Conference, where 21 of their 23 sports compete. The two exceptions are women's ice hockey and women’s bowling, which compete as de facto Division I member in the New England Women's Hockey Alliance and the East Coast Conference, respectively.

Varsity teams

List of teams

Men's sports (11)
Baseball
Basketball
Cross country
Football
Golf
Ice hockey
Lacrosse
Soccer
Indoor track & field
Outdoor track & field

Women's sports (13)
Basketball
Cross country
Field hockey
Ice hockey
Lacrosse
Soccer
Softball
Tennis
Volleyball
Bowling
Indoor track & field
Outdoor track & field
Golf

Individual programs
The college's athletic teams have been known as the Hawks since the mid-1930s. Prior to that, teams were "referred to as the Saints, the Hilltoppers, or simply St. Anselm's." In 1934, a contest was held to select a name, with  Blue Jays as the winning entry. However, that name was dropped in favor of Hawks in 1935.

Football
College football returned to the Hilltop in 1999 after a 58-year hiatus brought about by the onset of World War II. The team has played its home games at Grappone Stadium since the program's resumption.

One of the college's greatest athletes was Ray "Scooter" McLean; he was coach of the Green Bay Packers in 1953 and 1958 and a National Football League (NFL) player for the Chicago Bears, winning NFL Championship Games in 1940, 1941, 1943 and 1946. In more recent years, Michael Geary (class of 2005) was a Second Team All NE-10 offensive lineman in 2003.

Ice hockey
Saint Anselm is known by locals as a "hockey school" as both the men's and women's teams have earned championships in their respective conferences. The men's team has won nine Northeast-10 Conference championships, (four in a row) most recently by defeating Saint Michael’s in 2023. The Hawks performance in the 2012 Championship game set NE-10 records for most goals scored and largest margin of victory in a championship game. The women's team has earned the title of ECAC champions for two consecutive years, by defeating Holy Cross. In the 2012–13 season, the women held a record of 19–4–4 including a victory over Norwich University ending their 40-game win streak and earning them 3rd place over all in the D-III ECAC East standings. The campus has a multimillion-dollar,  ice arena, named after Thomas F. Sullivan. It is located next to Davison Dining Hall, and has a capacity of 2,700 fans.

Lacrosse 
The Saint Anselm men's lacrosse team was runners up in the NEC-10 Championship in 2021 and was nationally ranked at #8 after an undefeated regular season. They qualified for the NCAA Division II Championship where they beat Seton Hill in the 1st round of playoffs, and lost to Le Moyne in the Quarterfinals.

References

External links